West Ranch Airport  is a private airport located 8 miles west of Round Mountain, Blanco County, Texas, USA. It is located on the West Ranch owned by James M. West Sr. and his descendants.

External links

Airports in Texas
Buildings and structures in Blanco County, Texas
Transportation in Blanco County, Texas